This is a discography of Giuseppe Verdi's opera, Un ballo in maschera. It was first performed at the Teatro Apollo in Rome on 17 February 1859.

However, prior to the version of the opera which appears in the recordings below, Verdi had been using the title of Gustavo III and, when he was prohibited from using that title and after he was forced to make significant changes, the original version disappeared. It has been reconstructed, performed, and recorded as Gustavo III (Verdi). 

On the 5 Oct 2013 broadcast of BBC 3'S CD Review - Building a Library, musicologist Roger Parker surveyed recordings of Un Ballo in Maschera and recommended the 1975 recording by the New Philharmonia Orchestra, Chorus of the Royal House Covent Garden, Haberdashers' Aske's School Girls’ Choir, Riccardo Muti (conductor), as the best available choice.

Recordings

References
Notes

Sources
Operadis discography for Un ballo in maschera

Opera discographies
Operas by Giuseppe Verdi
Cultural depictions of Gustav III